Conwy Borough Football Club are a Welsh football club based in Conwy, playing in the Cymru North. Between 1977 and June 2012 they were known as Conwy United.

Club history
Following the demise of Borough United in 1967, Welsh representatives in the European Cup Winners’ Cup in 1963–64, there was a void of Welsh League clubs in the Conwy area.  Historically there has always been football in the area, and especially a Conwy team, stretching back to the 1870s.  In 1977 Conwy Town and Conwy Royal British Legion, both of whom played in the Vale of Conwy League, amalgamated to form Conwy United.

The club was duly elected to the Welsh League (North) that later became the Welsh Alliance League.  In 1981–82 the club won the Welsh Intermediate Cup (now called the FAW Welsh Trophy) and the club also won the Welsh Alliance League title in 1984–85 and 1985–86. In 1990 the club became founder members of the Cymru Alliance and finished in the top seven both seasons that they were members.

In 1992 the club became founder members of the League of Wales. The club finished a creditable seventh place in its first season and in 1995–96 finished in third place under the guidance of John Hulse, with Kenny McKenna setting a club scoring record of 49 goals in a season.  The club qualified for the 1996 UEFA Intertoto Cup and played Charleroi (Belgium) and SV Ried (Austria) at the Racecourse Ground, Wrexham, and travelled to Zaglebie Lubin (Poland) and Silkeborg (Denmark).  Despite not progressing past the group stage, the club gave a good account of itself especially with a 0–0 draw against Charleroi and losing to a late goal against SV Ried.

In the following three seasons the club reached the semi-finals of the Welsh Cup twice, and also qualified for the FAW Premier Cup twice, most notably holding Swansea City to 0–0 draw at the Vetch Field.  However the financial burden had begun to take its toll on the club and in 2000 were relegated.

The club decided not to progress to the Cymru Alliance for financial reasons and instead accepted an invitation to join the Welsh Alliance League. In its second season the club was League runners-up and Cookson Cup runners-up. The following two seasons were very difficult both on and off the field but the return of Nigel Roberts as manager kept the club up and the 2004–05 season started tremendously well with the club sitting at the top of the League. However, tragedy struck when Roberts was killed in a road accident. The league slipped just out of reach but under the guidance of Danny McGoona reached the final of the Cookson Cup again, only to lose out 4–3 to Bethesda in one of the most dramatic finals for years.

In the 2009–10 season under the management of Barry Jones and Keith Tansley a young Conwy side finally clinched the Cookson Cup. An extra time penalty from Matty Bennett won the trophy against rivals Llandudno Junction at Maesdu. In the league the club finished sixth.

The following season Paul Moroney took over as Manager with Barry Jones and Keith Tansley remaining at the club. The 2010–11 season turned out to be one of the most successful seasons of the clubs recent history. Although losing the first game of the season away at Denbigh, Moroney's side went on to win the Welsh Alliance Division One and gain promotion to the Cymru Alliance. Conwy also reached the final of the FAW Trophy (held at Belle Vue)) where they led by two goals to nil until the 91st minute and somehow conceded three goals in as many minutes to gift Holywell Town the Trophy in one of the most dramatic finals in years. Conwy United also won the Fairplay League and young star Toby Jones picked up the top goalscorer award with a forty plus tally in all competitions which earned the youngster a move to full-time at Neath.

In the 2011–12 season, Conwy got off to a flying start in the second tier of Welsh football winning their first four games under new management Steve Jones and Dean Martin. However, form dropped dramatically and in December the duo left the club. former chairman Geoff Cartwright appointed Mick McGrath as manager who signed a number of key players the team needed including Dean Canning, John Owen and Eddie Jebb (on-loan from Bangor City). The club went on to finish 10th.

In April 2012 the Football Association of Wales domestic committee approved a name change request that from the 2012–13 season the club was to be renamed Conwy Borough F.C

The club appointed Chris Herbert as the new first team manager in May 2012. The new manager re-structured the Y Morfa outfit in to a top three team which also lifted the league cup, when they beat Caersws on penalties in the final, with goalkeeper Terry McCormick saving two penalties, which was the Tangerines' 5th penalty shoot out win in cup competitions that season.

Chris Herbert and John Keegan left their posts in December 2013 and were replaced by players Darren Moss and Aden Shannon until the end of the season who guided the side to a second-placed finish. Moss was to remain in charge for the 2013–14 season but after a disappointing start was then was released by the club in November 2014 with Shannon taking temporary charge and overseeing an 11th-placed finish.  Shannon was placed in permanent charge of the Tangerines for the 2015–16 season but history was to repeat itself when, after a poor start and with the club languishing in the relegation zone, was relieved of his duties and was eventually replaced by Jason Aldcroft and former TNS defender Tommy Holmes. Aldcroft oversaw wholesale changes to the squad and steered the club to safety with an eventual 11th-placed finish.

Off the field, the club has made giant strides in improving the stadium and its facilities and opened its new clubhouse building "Y Morfa Venue" in the summer of 2014. With a recent upgrade to the floodlights the club has moved a step closer to achieving a domestic club licence. With a thriving junior section a youth Academy has also been established and expanded as the club looks to develop more local talent in the future.

At the close of the 2015–16 season, the resignations of Geoff Cartwright (chair) and Darren Cartwright (Vice Chair) due to personal commitments were accepted by the board of directors.  Aldcroft and Jones left the club leading to the appointment of Gareth Thomas as first team manager & assistant Alun Winstanley.

August 2017 saw the introduction of new directors to the Executive board – local businessman Luke Blundell, solicitor Chris Wilton & existing committee member Craig Crossfield.

Gareth Thomas departed from his role as team manager in December 2018 having been success during his first season, winning the Welsh Alliance Division One title, in addition to the FAW Trophy and Cookson Cup in a memorable treble-winning campaign.

Past players
Past players for the club who have gone on to the Football League include Emmanuel James Will Udo, Neville Southall, Carl Dale Hugh McAuley and Kevin Ellison.

Seasons

 Conwy United deducted 2 points.
 Conwy United deducted 3 points for failing to fulfil a fixture.
 Conwy United deducted 3 points.
 Conwy United deducted 3 points for failing to fulfil a fixture.

References

External links

Football clubs in Wales
Welsh Alliance League clubs
Association football clubs established in 1977
Conwy
Sport in Conwy County Borough
1977 establishments in Wales
Cymru Premier clubs
Cymru Alliance clubs
Cymru North clubs
Gwynedd League clubs
Welsh League North clubs